Riddu Riđđu is an annual Sámi music and culture festival held in Olmmáivággi (Manndalen) in the Gáivuotna (Kåfjord) municipality in Norway. The goal of the festival is to bring forward both Sámi culture and that of other indigenous peoples. Translated to English, the name of the festival is "small storm at the coast". The festival has permanent support from the Ministry of Culture and Church Affairs, the Sámi parliament, Troms county and Kåfjord municipality.

Riddu Riđđu includes concerts, seminars, performances, youth camp, stage art, literature, children's program, Northern People's program, youth camp, film program, courses (workshops),  art exhibition, market (bazaar), indigenous houses and much more.

The 30th festival was to be held 8–12 July 2020; however, due to the COVID-19 pandemic the 2020 festival was cancelled.

History
The festival was launched by a group of young Sámi on New Year's Eve 1991 at Olmmáivággi. This was a decade after the Sámi cultural revitalization started. Before that time, the Norwegian government attempted to assimilate the indigenous Sámi into the Norwegian majority population. In Olmmáivággi almost all of the previously majority Sámi population now considered themselves as Norwegian.

During the 1990s, the anti-Sámi sentiment was especially strong in the area with Sámi road-signs being shot to pieces and families being split. A group of youth started to ask questions such as: "Why did they [the Norwegian government] take away from us the Sámi language? Why do we hide our Sea-Sámi identity and culture? Why are we ashamed [of being Sámi]?" This started a Sámi youth organization that among other things organized the Riddu Riđđu festival.

The first festival was arranged in 1991 and has since been arranged annually. In 1998, the Riddu Riđđu Searvi organization was established and has since been responsible for arranging the festival. In 2018, Sandra Márjá West became the festival manager.

Lineups

2013 lineup
 Buffy Sainte-Marie
 Moana and the Tribe
 Oki Dub Ainu Band
 Elin Kåven
 Lovisa Negga
 Violet Road
 Admiral P
 Iva Lamkum
 Sisi

2014 lineup
 A Tribe Called Red
 Felgen Orkester
 Jon Henrik Fjällgren
 Biru Baby
 Tamikrest
 Hekla Stålstrenga
 Sator
 Jörgen Stenberg

2015 lineup
 Mari Boine
 Resirkulert
 Yann Tiersen
 Nanook
 Senjahopen
 Katchafire
 Amoc
 Urna
 F.A.C.E.

2016 lineup
 Slincraze
 Sofia Jannok
 Ana Tijoux
 Violet Road
 Sondre Justad
 Hanggai
 Marja Helena Fjellheim Mortensson
 Ylva
 Suming
 Herman Rundberg
 Kitok
 Traditional

2017 lineup
 Chalama Project
 Uyarakq
 Áilu Valle
 Dagny
 Duolva Duottar
 Ondt Blod
 Ágy
 Isák
 Johan Anders Bær
 Radik Tyulush
 Silver Jackson
 Dj Ailo

2018 lineup
 Mari Boine
 Baker Boy 
 Resirkulert
 Solju
 Wimme Saari
 Amanda Delara
 Felgen Orkester
 Biru Baby
 Tyva Kyzy
 DJ Shub

2019 lineup
 Buffy Sainte-Marie
 Wiyaala
 Maxida Märak
 ISÁK
 Tanya Tagaq
 Hildá Länsman
 Alash
 Opphav feat. Risten Anine
 Silla + Rise
 Ruben
 Jeremy Dutcher
 DJ: 169
 Mio Negga
 Alexia Galloway-Alainga
 Cheinesh
 DJ Rise Ashen
 Slincraze

2021 lineup
 ISÁK
 Agnete
 Kalle Urheim
 DJ iDJa with Åvla and Ramona Linnea
 Felgen Orkester
 A Million Pineapples
 Bats of Congress
 DJ collective Article 3
 OZAS
 Kajsa Balto

References

External links 

 
 
 Sámi Musical Performance and the Politics of Indigeneity in Northern Europe by Thomas Hilder

Music festivals in Norway
Sámi music
Cultural festivals in Norway
1991 establishments in Norway
Culture in Troms
Folk festivals in Norway
Music festivals established in 1991
Summer events in Norway
Indigenous music festivals
Gáivuotna–Kåfjord